Bjarne Jensen may refer to:

 Bjarne Jensen (curler) (born 1956), Danish wheelchair curler
 Bjarne Jensen (footballer) (born 1959), retired Danish footballer
 Bjarne Jensen (umpire) (born 1958), Danish cricket umpire

See also
 Bjarne Henning-Jensen (1908–1995), Danish film director and screenwriter